Llullaillaco National Park is a national park of Chile, 275 km southeast of Antofagasta in the Andes. It lies between the eastern slopes of the Cordillera Domeyko and the international border with Argentina. In the park there are several important mountains that culminate at the summit of Llullaillaco volcano. The park also is characterized by extensive semi-desert plains interspersed by Quebradas. A part of the Inca road system is found in Río Frío area.

Vegetation
The park lies within the Central Andean dry puna ecoregion. In the park have been recorded 126 flora species, 21 of which are endemic to the area.

Access
To access this area, the travel must be programmed and have official permission from the CONAF (National Forest Guard of Chile) in Antofagasta City.

Herds of vicuñas wander through the park.

References

 Parque Nacional Llullaillaco

Protected areas of Antofagasta Region
National parks of Chile
Protected areas established in 1995